Joanna Louise Roper,  (born 20 February 1969) is a British diplomat serving as British Ambassador to the Netherlands and Permanent Representative of the United Kingdom to the Organisation for the Prohibition of Chemical Weapons.

Having worked in the Home Office from 1992 to 2000, she joined the Foreign and Commonwealth Office (FCO) in 2001. Since 2017, she has been the FCO's Special Envoy for Gender Equality. Her former post include serving as deputy head and then interim head of the FCO's Counter-Terrorism Department (2008–2010), head of the FCO's China Department (2012–2014), and director of the United Kingdom's worldwide consular services. As a diplomat, she has been posted to Japan, Pakistan, and China.

In the 2016 Queen's Birthday Honours, she was appointed Companion of the Order of St Michael and St George (CMG) "for services to British foreign policy and the protection of British nationals overseas".

References

1969 births
Living people
British civil servants
Civil servants in the Foreign Office
Civil servants in the Home Office
20th-century British civil servants
21st-century British civil servants
Women civil servants
Companions of the Order of St Michael and St George
Alumni of the University of Kent
Ambassadors of the United Kingdom to the Netherlands